The Highview Fire District serves a population of 30,000 within a 21 square mile portion of southern Jefferson County, Kentucky. It is one of 18 individual fire districts that protect the unincorporated area surrounding the city of Louisville, Kentucky. Highview is primarily residential with a light commercial and industrial base. It is a combination career/volunteer department that operates from 3 stations.
 
The district has an ISO Class 3 rating and maintains a modern fleet of 17 vehicles. The department consists of a suppression force of 14 full-time and 41 volunteer firefighters. The career personnel work in three platoons and are available 24 hours a day. Volunteers are available at all hours. 
 
In addition to fire and rescue functions, Highview personnel are trained in hazardous materials, operations and technician levels, and lends members to the Jefferson County Trench, Louisville Metro Urban Search and Rescue Team, and Swift Water Rescue Teams. As many of the firefighters are also nationally registered Emergency Medical Technicians, the department provides Basic Life Support assistance to Louisville Metro EMS on an as needed basis.
 
The Highview Fire District is governed by a seven-member Board of Trustees. Three of these positions are appointed by the Mayor, two are elected property owners, and two are firefighter representatives. The operations budget is funded by a tax base. The current tax rate is 10 cents per $100 of assessed real property value.

Stations and apparatus

References

External links
 

Jefferson County, Kentucky
Fire departments in Kentucky
Fire protection districts in the United States